Honky Tonk Ranch is a reality television series that focuses on the country musical group The Bellamy Brothers. During the course of the series, the brothers are joined by their friends and family members, including musicians they have worked with during the period like Blake Shelton. John Schneider and Tanya Tucker. The series debuted in 2018 on The Cowboy Channel. Its second season was broadcast in 2019 on the same network, in addition to both seasons being streamed worldwide by RFD-TV. In 2020, the show moved to Circle Network.

References

External links

2018 American television series debuts
2010s American reality television series
Celebrity reality television series